Heterocrossa maculosa is a species of moth in the family Carposinidae. It is endemic to New Zealand. It is classified as "Data Deficient" by the Department of Conservation.

Taxonomy 
This species was originally described by Alfred Philpott in 1927 using a specimen collected from Cooper's Knob, Banks Peninsula by Stewart Lindsay and named Carposina maculosa. George Hudson discussed this species under this name in his 1928 publication The Butterflies and Moths of New Zealand. In 1978 Elwood Zimmerman argued that the genus Heterocrassa  should not be a synonym of Carposina as the genitalia in this genus are distinctive. Subsequently John S. Dugdale placed this species within the genus Heterocrossa. The holotype specimen is held at the New Zealand Arthropod Collection.

Description 
Philpott originally described the species as follows:

Distribution 
This species is endemic to New Zealand.  It is known from the Lyttelton Hills and Otago. Other than the type locality, this species has also been collected from Hoon Hay Bush.

Biology and behaviour 
The adult moths are on the wing in November.

Host species and habitat 
The larvae feed on Hoheria angustifolia and Plagianthus regius.

Conservation status 
This species has been classified as having the "Data Deficient" conservation status under the New Zealand Threat Classification System. The main risks to this species are likely habitat fragmentation and loss.

References

Carposinidae
Moths of New Zealand
Moths described in 1927
Endemic fauna of New Zealand
Endemic moths of New Zealand